Albert Blan (13 January 1930 in Wigan, Lancashire – 27 September 2015) was an English professional rugby league footballer who played in the 1940s, 1950s and 1960s, and coached in the 1960s and 1970s. He played at representative level for England, and at club level for Wigan (A-Team) and Swinton, and coached at club level for Swinton. Blan was the Lions' astute captain during much of his service with the club leading them to their two successive First Division Championships of 1962–63 and 1963–64. Blan was also a skilled place kicker whether a penalty or a conversion. Many Swinton fans often referred to him as "Brainy Blan", and with very good reason.

Playing career

International honours
Blan won a cap for England while at Swinton in 1953 against France.

Championship appearances
Blan played, and was captain in Swinton's victories in the Championship during the 1962–63 season, and the 1963–64 season. These were also the only two seasons between the 1905–06 season, and the 1972–73 season in which a playoff wasn't used to determine the Championship winners.

County League appearances
Blan played, and was captain in Swinton's victory in the Lancashire County League during the 1960–61 season. Blan played , and was captain in Swinton's 9–15 defeat by St. Helens in the 1960 Lancashire County Cup Final during the 1960–61 season at Central Park, Wigan on Saturday 29 October 1960, played , and was captain in the 9–25 defeat by St. Helens in the 1961 Lancashire County Cup Final during the 1961–62 season at Central Park, Wigan on Saturday 11 November 1961, and played , and was captain in the 4–7 defeat by St. Helens in the 1962 Lancashire County Cup Final during the 1962–63 season at Central Park, Wigan on Saturday 27 October 1962.

Coaching career
In the late 1960s/early 1970s Albert Blan coached Swinton, including an 11–2 victory over Leigh in the 1969 Lancashire County Cup Final during the 1969–70 season at Central Park, Wigan on Saturday 1 November 1969, an achievement which alluded him as team captain in the three finals against St. Helens in consecutive seasons, 1960–61, 1961–62 and 1962–63.

Genealogical information
Blan was the younger brother of both Wigan and Salford rugby league ; Jackie Blan and rugby league footballer; Billy Blan.

Death
Blan died in Chorley Hospital on Sunday, 27 September 2015 aged 85 years.

References

External links
(archived by web.archive.org) Championship winning team of 1964 (with the Cup on his head)

1930 births
2015 deaths
England national rugby league team players
English rugby league coaches
English rugby league players
Rugby league players from Wigan
Rugby league centres
Rugby league fullbacks
Rugby league locks
Rugby league utility players
Swinton Lions captains
Swinton Lions coaches
Swinton Lions players